Liverpool Hilton could refer to one of four hotels in Liverpool, England, United Kingdom:
 Hilton Liverpool City Centre, 3 Thomas Steers Way, Liverpool One
 DoubleTree by Hilton Liverpool (Municipal Annexe), 6 Sir Thomas Street
 Hampton by Hilton Liverpool City Centre, Kings Dock Mill, 7 Hurst Street
 Hampton by Hilton Liverpool John Lennon Airport, Speke Hall Avenue